Rodrigo Pimpão Vianna (born 23 October 1987 in Curitiba), known as Rodrigo Pimpão, is a Brazilian footballer who plays as a forward for Remo.

Honours
Vasco da Gama
Campeonato Brasileiro Série B: 2009

Tractor Sazi
Hazfi Cup: 2013–14

Botafogo
Campeonato Brasileiro Série B: 2015
Campeonato Carioca: 2018

CSA
Campeonato Alagoano: 2021

References

External links
 Rodrigo Pimpão at Cerezo Osaka official site 
 
 Rodrigo Pimpão at Netvasco.com 
 Rodrigo Pimpão at Yahoo! Japan competition record 
 
 

1987 births
Living people
Footballers from Curitiba
Brazilian footballers
Association football forwards
Campeonato Brasileiro Série A players
Campeonato Brasileiro Série B players
Campeonato Brasileiro Série C players
J1 League players
K League 1 players
UAE Pro League players
Persian Gulf Pro League players
Paraná Clube players
CR Vasco da Gama players
Associação Atlética Ponte Preta players
América Futebol Clube (MG) players
América Futebol Clube (RN) players
Botafogo de Futebol e Regatas players
Cerezo Osaka players
Omiya Ardija players
Suwon Samsung Bluewings players
Tractor S.C. players
Emirates Club players
Centro Sportivo Alagoano players
Operário Ferroviário Esporte Clube players
Clube do Remo players
Brazilian expatriate footballers
Brazilian expatriate sportspeople in Japan
Brazilian expatriate sportspeople in South Korea
Brazilian expatriate sportspeople in Iran
Brazilian expatriate sportspeople in the United Arab Emirates
Expatriate footballers in Japan
Expatriate footballers in South Korea
Expatriate footballers in Iran
Expatriate footballers in the United Arab Emirates